Magnolia ekmanii is a species of plant. It is listed as critically endangered by the IUCN.

Description
M. ekmanii is a slow growing tree,  with oblong simple alternate leaves and white flowers. The leaves have a shiny upper side and are superficially similar to the leaves of the Santo Domingo apricot. This inspired the Haitian Creole name of the plant: abriko moron ( "wild apricot"). The flowering period starts in June and peaks mid of July. Seeds are released from ripe fruit in the two months from mid of November to mid of January.

Range
The species is endemic to Southwestern Haiti. It is known from a few mountains in the Occidental Massif de la Hotte only. The main population grows on Morne Grand Bois in Grand Bois National Park.

Habitat

Ecology

Etymology
The species has been given the specific epithet "ekmanii", to honour the Swedish Botanist  Erik Leonard Ekman who first documented it scientifically.

Taxonomy

References

ekmanii
Flora of Haiti
Taxa named by Ignatz Urban